Adriana Crisci (born 24 July 1982) is an Italian artistic gymnast, born in Germany. She competed at the 2000 Summer Olympics in Sydney.

References

External links

1982 births
Living people
Italian female artistic gymnasts
Olympic gymnasts of Italy
Gymnasts at the 2000 Summer Olympics
People from Rhein-Sieg-Kreis
Sportspeople from Cologne (region)